MillionaireMatch is an online dating website focusing on long term relationships and marriages, popular primarily in the United States, Canada, the United Kingdom, Australia and Germany. Because of the focus on relationships between attractive and wealthy singles, MillionaireMatch is considered a special-interest online dating site. The company was launched in Silicon Valley, California by Jason Du.

History
MillionaireMatch was founded by UC Berkeley graduate Jason Du in Silicon Valley in 2001. Jason Du still serves as the company's CEO.

In 2015, MillionaireMatch deleted over a thousand user profiles for not matching its criteria, with the users being "either not attractive or too poor" to be on the website.

By November 2016, the website had 2.9 million registered members, and by February 2021, the number of users increased to 3.8 million users with 2.6 million located in the United States.

Modus operandi
MillionaireMatch business model is based on a membership system with monthly subscriptions There is also a free registration, but free accounts are limited in communication. Users can register for an account on the internet or through its mobile app. According to DatingScout, "The member structure in MillionaireMatch is equally divided into men and women. Most users come from the United States and are in the age range of 35-54 years." There is a minimum income threshold for registration for those users who fall into category of "wealthy". The website is also available in iOS and Android mobile apps.

Issues
The website has attracted considerable controversy in the media and much criticism since its inception due to its exclusive business model of only allowing perceived attractive or wealthy individuals to join the dating community. The company was also called "Sugar Daddy Dating Site" but it rejects that definition citing the company's focus on long term relationships and marriages.
In April, 2020, Fox Business reported on 20% increase of the fake profiles on MillionaireMatch website during COVID-19 pandemic.

See also
 Comparison of online dating services
 Timeline of online dating services

References

Online dating for specific interests
Online dating services of Canada
Canadian companies established in 2001
Internet properties established in 2001
Mobile social software
Online dating applications